The 2016 All-Ireland Senior Football Championship was the 129th edition of the GAA's premier inter-county gaelic football tournament since its establishment in 1887.

33 teams took part. 31 of the 32 Counties of Ireland participated, with Kilkenny, as in previous years, declining to take part. London and New York again competed.

The winning team, Dublin (who defeated Mayo by a single point after a replay), received the Sam Maguire Cup. It was the first time Dublin, as defending champions, had retained the trophy since the 1977 final.

Format

Provincial Championships format
Connacht, Leinster, Munster and Ulster each organise a provincial championship. All provincial matches are knock-out. All teams eliminated from their provincial championships with the exception of New York, for logistical reasons, enter the All-Ireland qualifiers.

Qualifiers format
Twenty eight of the twenty nine teams beaten in the provincial championships enter the All-Ireland qualifiers, which are knockout. The sixteen teams eliminated before their provincial semi-finals play eight matches in round 1, with the winners of these games playing the eight beaten provincial semi-finalists in round 2. The eight winning teams from round 2 play-off against each other in round 3, with the four winning teams facing the four beaten provincial finalists in round 4 to complete the double-elimination format. Further details of the format are included with each qualifier round listed below.

All-Ireland format
The four provincial champions play the four winners of round 4 of the qualifiers in the quarter-finals. Two semi-finals and a final follow. All matches are knock-out. Any game that ends in a draw is replayed. If a replay ends in a draw, extra time is played.

Changes from 2015 championship
Referees were instructed to add on 20 seconds for the introduction of a substitute and 20 seconds for each instance of a goalkeeper or defender going upfield for a placed ball attempt. Previously there was no specific provision for these two events which led to instances of deliberate time-wasting by teams who were leading. 30 seconds were also to be added each time the Hawk-Eye score detection system was utilised.

Broadcast rights
RTÉ, the national broadcaster in Ireland, provided the majority of the live television coverage of the championship in the third year of a deal running from 2014 until 2016. A number of matches were also broadcast by Sky Sports, with Sky having exclusive rights to some games.

Live broadcast matches
The broadcast schedule for matches shown live on television in Ireland follows -

Provincial championships

Connacht Senior Football Championship

Leinster Senior Football Championship

Munster Senior Football Championship

Ulster Senior Football Championship

All-Ireland Series

Qualifiers

A and B teams
An A and B system for the qualifier draws was introduced in 2014 and was retained. The teams were designated as A or B depending on which half of their provincial championships they played in. Although some teams receive byes in the early provincial rounds, their position in the round in which they entered the competition was usually determined by the provincial draw, resulting in most teams being designated as A or B randomly. For example, each of the four provinces had two semi-finals – one between two teams designated A and one between two teams designated B. The beaten semi-finalists in each province were always one A team and one B team.

In all qualifier rounds A teams played A teams and B teams played B teams. Usually the A teams played their provincial games before the B teams, which allowed the A qualifier games to be scheduled a week before the B qualifier games.

Round 1
In the first round of the qualifiers sixteen of the seventeen teams beaten in the preliminary rounds or quarter-finals of the provincial championships competed. New York did not enter the qualifiers. Four A teams played four A teams, while four B teams played four B teams. The round 1 draw was unrestricted − if two teams had played each other in a provincial match they could be drawn to meet again, with the winner of the provincial match receiving home advantage. The eight round 1 winners played the eight beaten provincial semi-finalists in round 2 of the qualifiers.

The following teams were entered into round 1.

 
 Leitrim 
 London 

 
 Carlow  
 Laois 
 Louth 
 Wicklow  
 Longford  
 Offaly 
 Wexford  

 
 Waterford 
 Limerick 

 
 Armagh 
 Derry 
 Antrim  
 Down 
 Fermanagh 

*During the match Laois made seven substitutions, one more than the permitted six. On 21 June 2016 the CCCC declared the match void and scheduled a replay for 2 July.

Round 2
In the second round of the qualifiers the eight winning teams from Round 1A and Round 1B played the eight beaten provincial semi-finalists. The round 2 draw was unrestricted − if two teams had played each other in a provincial match they could be drawn to meet again, with the winner of the provincial match receiving home advantage. The eight winners of these matches played each other in Round 3.

The following teams took part in this round -

 Carlow
 Derry
 Laois
 Leitrim

 Cavan
 Clare
 Meath
 Sligo

 Fermanagh
 Limerick
 Longford
 Offaly

 Cork
 Kildare
 Mayo
 Monaghan

Round 3
In the third round of the qualifiers winning teams from round 2A  played against winning teams from round 2A, while winning teams from round 2B played against winning teams from round 2B. Round 3 rules did not allow two teams that had played each other in a provincial match to meet again. The four winners of these matches played the four beaten provincial finalists in Round 4.

The following teams took part in this round -

 Cavan
 Clare
 Derry
 Sligo

 Cork
 Kildare
 Longford
 Mayo

Round 4
In the fourth round of the qualifiers, the four winning teams of Round 3A and Round 3B played the four beaten provincial finalists. Round 4 rules did not allow two teams that had played each other in a provincial match to meet again if such a pairing could be avoided. The four winners of these matches played the provincial champions in the All-Ireland Quarter-finals.

The following teams took part in this round -

 Clare
 Derry

 Roscommon
 Tipperary

 Cork
 Mayo

 Donegal
 Westmeath

Quarter-finals
The four provincial champions played the winners from Round 4 of the qualifiers. Draw rules – 1) Two teams who met in a provincial final could not meet again 2) If one of the provincial champions had already met one of the qualifiers in an earlier match then those two teams could not be drawn together if such a pairing could be avoided.

Semi-finals
There was no draw for the semi-finals as the fixtures were pre-determined on a three yearly rotation. This rotation ensured that a province's champions played the champions of all the other provinces once every three years in the semi-finals if they each won their quarter-finals and prevented two provincial champions meeting in the semi-finals in successive years. If a qualifier team defeated a provincial winner in a quarter-final, the qualifier team took that provincial winner's place in the semi-final.

Final

Final Replay

Championship statistics
All scores correct as of 1 October 2016

Top scorer overall

Top scorer in a single game

Miscellaneous
 Tipperary beat Cork for the first time since 1944.
 Kerry were the first team since Cork (1987–1990) to win a 4th Munster title in a row.
 In the old system All Ireland series we would have had a Galway vs Tyrone All Ireland semi-final.
 The All-Ireland final ends in a draw and goes to a replay for the first time since 2000.

Scoring events
Widest winning margin: 19
Monaghan 2-22 – 0-9 Down (Ulster SFC quarter-final)
Most goals in a match: 7
Tyrone 5-18 – 2-17 Cavan (Ulster SFC semi-final replay)
Most points in a match: 41
Down 3-17 – 2-24 Longford (Round 1B qualifier – A.E.T.)
Most goals by one team in a match: 5
Tyrone 5-18 – 2-17 Cavan (Ulster SFC semi-final replay)
Highest aggregate score: 56 points
Down 3-17 – 2-24 Longford (Round 1B qualifier – A.E.T.)
Tyrone 5-18 – 2-17 Cavan (Ulster SFC semi-final replay)
Lowest aggregate score: 17 points
Wexford 0-08 – 0-09 Kildare (Leinster SFC quarter-final)

Stadia and locations

Referees Panel
As announced in April 2016:
 Ciaran Branagan (Down)
 Barry Cassidy (Derry)
 David Coldrick (Meath)
 Maurice Deegan (Laois)
 Marty Duffy (Sligo)
 David Gough (Meath)
 Rory Hickey (Clare)
 Pádraig Hughes (Armagh)
 Sean Hurson (Tyrone)
 Fergal Kelly (Longford)
 Eddie Kinsella (Laois)
 Conor Lane (Cork)
 Joe McQuillan (Cavan)
 Noel Mooney (Cavan), first year
 Paddy Neilan (Roscommon)
 Anthony Nolan (Wicklow)
 Derek O'Mahoney (Tipperary)
 Padraig O'Sullivan (Kerry)

Linesman Panel (newly created)
 James Bermingham (Cork)
 Niall Cullen (Fermanagh)
 Liam Devenney (Mayo)
 Jerome Henry (Mayo)
 John Hickey (Carlow)
 Shaun McLaughlin (Donegal)
 Martin McNally (Monaghan)
 Cormac Reilly (Meath)

Awards
The Sunday Game Team of the Year
The Sunday Game team of the year was picked on 1 October, the night of the final replay. Dublin's Brian Fenton was named as The Sunday Game player of the year.

1. Stephen Cluxton (Dublin)
2. Brendan Harrison (Mayo)
3. Jonny Cooper (Dublin)
4. Philly McMahon (Dublin)
5. Lee Keegan (Mayo)
6. Colm Boyle (Mayo)
7. Patrick Durcan (Mayo)
8. Brian Fenton (Dublin)
9. Mattie Donnelly (Tyrone)
10. Kevin McLoughlin (Mayo)
11. Diarmuid Connolly (Dublin)
12. Ciarán Kilkenny (Dublin)
13. Paul Geaney (Kerry)
14. Michael Quinlivan (Tipperary)
15. Dean Rock (Dublin)

All Star Team of the Year
The All Star football team was announced on 3 November.

1. David Clarke (Mayo)
2. Brendan Harrison (Mayo)
3. Jonny Cooper (Dublin)
4. Philly McMahon (Dublin)
5. Lee Keegan (Mayo)
6. Colm Boyle (Mayo)
7. Ryan McHugh (Donegal)
8. Brian Fenton (Dublin)
9. Mattie Donnelly (Tyrone)
10. Peter Harte (Tyrone)
11. Diarmuid Connolly (Dublin)
12. Ciarán Kilkenny (Dublin)
13. Dean Rock (Dublin)
14. Michael Quinlivan (Tipperary)
15. Paul Geaney (Kerry)

See also
 2016 Tipperary county football team season
 2016 Mayo county football team season
 2016 Down county football team season
 2016 Galway county football team season

References